Mnemosyne is an album by jazz saxophonist Jan Garbarek released in 1999 by ECM Records. The album is a sequel to Officium (1994), one of the most significant recordings in Garbarek’s career. Like the first album, it is a collaboration with the vocal ensemble the Hilliard Ensemble.

Track listing 
CD 1
 "Quechua Song" – 7:12
 "O Lord in Thee Is All My Trust" – 5:09
 "Estonian Lullaby" – 1:58
 "Remember Me My Dear" – 6:30
 "Gloria" – 6:03
 "Fayrfax Africanus" – 4:05
 "Agnus Dei" – 8:38
 "Novus Novus" – 2:18
 "Se Je Fays Dueil" – 5:12
 "O Ignis Spiritus" – 10:53

CD 2
 "Alleluia Nativitatis" – 5:06
 "Delphic Paean" – 4:46
 "Strophe and Counter-Strophe" – 5:02
 "Mascarados" – 5:02
 "Loiterando" – 5:33
 "Estonian Lullaby" – 2:01
 "Russian Psalm" – 3:45
 "Eagle Dance" – 4:48
 "When Jesus Wept" – 3:22
 "Hymn to the Sun" – 7:28

Personnel 

 Jan Garbarek – soprano saxophone, tenor saxophone 
 Hilliard Ensemble – vocal ensemble
 Rogers Covey-Crump – tenor vocals
 John Potter – tenor vocals
 Gordon Jones – baritone vocals
 David James – countertenor vocals
 Friedrich Hölderlin – lyrics

References

External links 
 Jan Garbarek - Mnemosyne (1999) album review by Richard S. Ginell, credits & releases at AllMusic
 Jan Garbarek - Mnemosyne (1999) album releases & credits at Discogs
 Jan Garbarek - Mnemosyne (1999) album credits & user reviews at ProgArchives.com
 Jan Garbarek - Mnemosyne (1999) album to be listened as stream on Spotify

1999 albums
Jan Garbarek albums
ECM Records albums
Albums produced by Manfred Eicher